My Left Foot: The Story of Christy Brown, also known simply as My Left Foot, is a 1989 biographical comedy-drama film directed by Jim Sheridan adapted by Sheridan and Shane Connaughton from the 1954 memoir of the same name by Christy Brown. A co-production of Ireland and the United Kingdom, it stars Daniel Day-Lewis as Brown, an Irish man born with cerebral palsy, who could control only his left foot. Brown grew up in a poor working-class family, and became a writer and artist. Brenda Fricker, Ray McAnally, Hugh O'Conor, Fiona Shaw, and Cyril Cusack are featured in supporting roles.

The film was theatrically released on 24 February 1989 to critical and commercial success. Reviewers praised the film's screenplay and direction, its message, and especially the performances of Day-Lewis and Fricker, while the film grossed $14.7 million on a £600,000 budget. At the 62nd Academy Awards, the film received five nominations, including for the Best Picture, with Day-Lewis and Fricker winning Best Actor and Best Supporting Actress, respectively. In 2018, the British Film Institute ranked it as the 53rd greatest British film of the 20th century.

Plot
In 1932, Christy Brown is born into a Dublin family of 15. Doctors discover he has severe cerebral palsy. Christy is unable to walk or talk. He is loved and supported by his family, especially his mother. One day, Christy's mother trips down the stairs while in labour and Christy was the only person home to see it. He was able to alert some neighbours and summon them over to help. Christy's father, who never believed Christy would amount to anything, starts to become proud after witnessing him use his left foot, the only body part he can fully control, to write the word "mother" on the floor with a piece of chalk.

Consequently, Christy seeks a hobby in painting. The neighbourhood youngsters include him in their activities, like street football, but when he paints a picture and gives it to a girl he likes, she returns it. Later, his father loses his job and the family faces exceptionally difficult hardships, so Christy devises a plan to help his brothers steal coal to their mother's dismay. Christy's mother, who had been gradually gathering some savings in a tin in the fireplace, finally saves enough to buy him a wheelchair.

Christy is then introduced to Eileen Cole, who takes him to her school for cerebral palsy patients and persuades a friend of hers to hold an exhibition of his work. Christy falls in love with Cole, but when he learns during the dinner that she is engaged to be married, he considers suicide. His mother helps him build a private studio for himself, but soon afterward his father dies of a stroke, and during the wake Christy instigates a brawl. At this point, Christy starts writing his autobiography, "My Left Foot". Cole returns and they resume their friendship. Later on, Christy attends a charity event where he meets his handler, a nurse named Mary Carr. She begins reading his autobiography. He asks Mary to go out with him and they then happily leave the fete together.

Cast

 Daniel Day-Lewis as Christy Brown, a man born with cerebral palsy
 Hugh O'Conor as Young Christy Brown
 Brenda Fricker as Bridget Fagan Brown, Christy's mother
 Ray McAnally as Patrick Brown, Christy's father
 Fiona Shaw as Eileen Cole, Christy's carer
 Kirsten Sheridan as Sharon Brown, Christy's sister
 Alison Whelan as Sheila Brown, Christy's sister
 Eanna MacLiam as Benny Brown, Christy's brother
 Declan Croghan as Tom Brown, Christy's brother
 Marie Conmee as Sadie Brown, Christy's sister
 Cyril Cusack as Lord Castlewelland
 Phelim Drew as Brian
 Eileen Colgan as Nan
 Ruth McCabe as Mary Carr, Christy's handler and eventual wife
 Adrian Dunbar as Peter, Cole's fiancé

Production
Day-Lewis became interested in the project when he read the opening scene, which features him, as Brown, using his left foot to place a record on a player and then placing a needle onto it so that it will play. He said of the scene: "I knew it couldn't be done... and that intrigued me." Many scenes were filmed through a mirror, as Day-Lewis could only manipulate his right foot to perform the actions seen in the film. Day-Lewis spent some time preparing for the film at Brown's alma mater in Dublin. He later returned there for a visit, with his Academy Award.

Day-Lewis, known for his extreme method acting, insisted on staying in character during the production of the film, refusing to do anything that Brown couldn't do. This meant that members of the film crew had to move the actor around in a wheelchair, lift him over obstacles, and even feed him.

Reception

Critical
My Left Foot received widespread critical acclaim. On the review aggregator Rotten Tomatoes, the film has an approval rating of 98%, based on 43 reviews, with an average rating of 8.2/10. The site's critics consensus reads: "No doubt most will come to My Left Foot for Daniel Day-Lewis' performance, but the movie's refusal to go downbeat will keep it in viewers' minds afterwards." On Metacritic, the film has a weighted average score of 97 out of 100, based on 17 critic reviews, indicating "universal acclaim".

Roger Ebert gave the film four out of four stars, writing: "My Left Foot is a great film for many reasons, but the most important is that it gives us such a complete picture of this man's life. It is not an inspirational movie, although it inspires. It is not a sympathetic movie, although it inspires sympathy. It is the story of a stubborn, difficult, blessed and gifted man who was dealt a bad hand, who played it brilliantly, and who left us some good books, some good paintings and the example of his courage. It must not have been easy."

In 2015, The Hollywood Reporter polled hundreds of academy members, asking them to re-vote on past controversial decisions. Academy members indicated that, given a second chance, they would award the 1990 Academy Award for Best Picture to My Left Foot instead of Driving Miss Daisy.

Accolades

See also
 BFI Top 100 British films

References

External links
 
 
 
 

1989 comedy-drama films
1989 directorial debut films
1989 films
1980s British films
1980s English-language films
Biographical films about painters
Biographical films about writers
British comedy-drama films
English-language Irish films
Films about disability
Films about mother–son relationships
Films about paraplegics or quadriplegics
Films about people with cerebral palsy
Films about the working class
Films based on biographies
Films directed by Jim Sheridan
Films featuring a Best Actor Academy Award-winning performance
Films featuring a Best Supporting Actress Academy Award-winning performance
Films scored by Elmer Bernstein
Films set in Dublin (city)
Films shot in Dublin (city)
Films shot in the Republic of Ireland
Independent Spirit Award for Best Foreign Film winners
Irish drama films